Devon Meadows is a town in Victoria, Australia, 50 km south-east of Melbourne's Central Business District, located within the City of Casey local government area. Devon Meadows recorded a population of 1,551 at the 2021 census.

Devon Meadows Post Office was located at 89 Finsubury Devon Meadows and opened on 21 March 1915, and closed in 1941.The original building was one of the oldest buildings in Devon Meadows. It became a residential home and was known as being haunted, but burnt down around 1984. The oldest home was owned by the Rawlins family in Worthing Road.

Devon Meadows contains a primary school with a current enrolment of about 300, a CFA fire station, community hall, and tennis club.

Just east of the main township is a locality known Five Ways after the split intersection where three roads leave the South Gippsland Highway bound for Berwick, Koo Wee Rup and Cannons Creek. A general store at the intersection provides services to travelers.

The town has an Australian Rules football team (the Devon Meadows Panthers) competing in the Mornington Peninsula Nepean Football League, and a cricket team also known as the Panthers that competes in the District Division of the West Gippsland Cricket Association.

Transport
 795 Cranbourne – Warneet (Monday to Friday). Operated by Cranbourne Transit.
 796 Cranbourne – Cranbourne (Monday to Friday (school days)). Operated by Cranbourne Transit.

References

Towns in Victoria (Australia)
City of Casey